Zinaida Venediktovna Vorkul (2 May 1909 – 15 December 1994) was a Soviet stage and film actress. She is known for playing character roles, usually as a mother or grandmother.

Selected filmography
 1948  — The Young Guard as Osmukhin's mother
 1957  — Gutta-percha Boy as laundress
 1964  — Jack Frost as Ivan's mother
 1964  — The Chairman as episode
 1966  — Andrei Rublev as Mary, the wanderer
 1967  — Fire, Water, and Brass Pipes as Witch
 1969  —  Funny Magic   as episode
 1973  — Seventeen Moments of Spring as Nurse in the shelter
 1981  — Carnival as Zinaida, Solomatin's mother
 1983  — Eternal Call as Markovna
 1990  — Cloud-Paradise as old woman

References

External links 
 
 Filmography at kino-teatr.ru

1909 births
1994 deaths
Actresses from Saint Petersburg
Soviet film actresses
Russian State Institute of Performing Arts alumni
20th-century Russian actresses